Temporal discretization is a mathematical technique applied to transient problems that occur in the fields of applied physics and engineering.

Transient problems are often solved by conducting simulations using computer-aided engineering (CAE) packages, which require discretizing the governing equations in both space and time. Such problems are unsteady (e.g. flow problems), and therefore require solutions in which position varies as a function of time. Temporal discretization involves the integration of every term in different equations over a time step.

The spatial domain can be discretized to produce a semi-discrete form:

If the discretization is done using backward differences, the first-order temporal discretization is given as:

And the second-order discretization is given as:

where
  is a scalar quantity.
  is the value at the next time level, .
  is the value at the current time level, .
  is the value at the previous time level, .

The function  is evaluated using implicit- and explicit-time integration.

Description 
The temporal discretization is done through integration over time on the general discretized equation. First, values at a given control volume  at time interval  are assumed and then value at time interval  is found. This method states that the time integral of a given variable is equal to a weighted average between current and future values. The integral form of the equation can be written as:

where  is a weight between 0 and 1.

  results in the fully explicit scheme.
  results in the fully implicit scheme.
  results in the Crank-Nicolson scheme.

For any control volume this integration holds true for any discretized variable. The following equation is obtained when applied to the governing equation including full discretized diffusion, convection, and source terms.

Methods for evaluating function F(φ) 
After discretizing the time derivative, function  remains to be evaluated. The function is now evaluated using implicit and explicit-time integration.

Implicit-time integration
This methods evaluates the function  at a future time.

Formulation
The evaluation using implicit-time integration is given as:

In case of implicit method, the setup is unconditionally stable and can handle large time step. But, stability doesn't mean accuracy. Therefore, large  affects accuracy and defines time resolution. But, behavior may involve physical timescale that needs to be resolved.

Explicit-time integration 
This methods evaluates the function  at a current time.

Formulation
The evaluation using explicit-time integration is given as:

And is referred as explicit integration since  can be expressed explicitly in the existing solution values, :

Here, the time step is restricted by stability limit of the solver (i.e., time step is limited by the Courant–Friedrichs–Lewy condition. To be accurate with respect to time, same time step should be used in all the domain and to be stable, the time step must be the minimum of all the local time steps in the domain. This method is also referred to as "global time stepping".

Examples
Many schemes use explicit-time integration. Some of these are as follows:

 Lax–Wendroff method
 Runge–Kutta method

See also

 Courant–Friedrichs–Lewy condition.
 Von Neumann stability analysis.
 Finite element method
 Explicit and implicit methods
 Chi-Wang Shu

References

Computer-aided engineering